Cholet Le Pontreau Airport  is an airport in the French department of Maine-et-Loire,  north-northeast of the city of Cholet.

References

External links 

Airports in Pays de la Loire
Buildings and structures in Indre-et-Loire
Transport in Centre-Val de Loire
Transport in Cholet